Ibiza may refer to:

Places
 Ibiza, a Spanish island in the Mediterranean Sea, part of the Balearic Islands archipelago
 Ibiza (town), a city and municipality located on the southeast coast of the island of Ibiza
 Ibiza Airport, the airport serving the Balearic Islands of Ibiza and Formentera

Films
 Ibiza (film)
 Ibiza, Ibiza, a 1986 Welsh comedy television film
 Welcome 2 Ibiza, a 2003 American action comedy film

Music
Ibiza (song), a 2015 single by The Prodigy

"Ibiza", a 1961 song by José Guardiola
"Ibiza", a 1989 song by José Feliciano
"Ibiza", instrumental by Jaared from the saxophonist's 2002 album Hangtime
 "Ibiza", a song by El Loco from A Bugged Out Mix by Miss Kittin
 "Ibiza Bar", a song by Pink Floyd, featured on their third album More
 "I Took a Pill in Ibiza", a song by Mike Posner, from his second studio album At Night, Alone
 "We're Going to Ibiza", a song by the Vengaboys
 Ibiza, a Russian single by Philipp Kirkorov and Nikolay Baskov

Sports
 SE Eivissa-Ibiza, a former football club from Ibiza
 SD Ibiza, a former football club from Ibiza
 UD Ibiza, a football club from Ibiza

Transportation
 Ibiza (Madrid Metro), a station on Line 9 of the Madrid Metro
 SEAT Ibiza, a supermini car manufactured by SEAT since 1984

Other uses
 Ibiza (Vino de la Tierra), a Spanish geographical indication for wines in the Balearic Islands
 Ibiza International Film Festival, an annual independent cinema festival
 Roman Catholic Diocese of Ibiza
 Ibiza affair, a 2019 political scandal in Austria